Georges Lecointe may refer to:
 Georges Lecointe (explorer) (1869–1929), Belgian naval officer and explorer
 Georges Lecointe (rower) (1897–1932), French rower